Dafnis B.C. is a Greek professional basketball club. The club's full name is Athlitikos Omilos Dafnis B.C., or A.O. Dafnis B.C. The club is located in Dafni, Athens, Greece. The colors of the team are yellow and black, and the team's symbol is the laurel branch.

History
The athletic organization's parent athletic union, the A.O. A.C. Dafni, was founded in 1939, when the sports club started with a football club. In 1967, the athletic union added the basketball club, A.O. Dafni B.C., as one of its sports sections.

In 1969, the team competed in the top-tier level Greek Basket League for the first time, and stayed there until 1975. Throughout the 1980s and 1990s, the club often competed in the Greek top-tier league (A1). Legendary EuroLeague player Theo Papaloukas, played with the club from 1997 to 1999. In the 1998–99 season, Papaloukas led Dafni B.C. to the Greek 2nd Division championship. In 2010, Dafni and A.O. Amyntas merged, creating A.O. Amyntas Dafnis. In 2015, the two clubs broke their merger, and Dafni was reformed.

Championships and honors
Divisional:
Greek A2 League: 1
1999

Notable players

 Fanis Christodoulou
 Theo Papaloukas
 Tzanis Stavrakopoulos
 Dinos Angelidis
 Ioannis Sioutis
 Ioannis Milonas
 Makis Dreliozis
 Nikos Liakopoulos
 Ioannis Gagaloudis
 Fotios Vasilopoulos
 Georgios Limniatis
 Dimitris Fosses
 Dimitris Lolas
- Vasco Evtimov
 Stephen Arigbabu
 Mike Smrek
- Rowan Barrett
 Blue Edwards
 Buck Johnson
 Rodrick Rhodes
 Zendon Hamilton
 Richard Rellford
 A.J. Bramlett
 Derrick Chievous
 Gary Plummer
 Bubba Wells
 Scotty Thurman
 Geno Carlisle

Head coaches
 Dirk Bauermann
 Kostas Missas
 Vassilis Fragkias
 Zoran Slavnić

External links
Eurobasket.com Team Profile

Basketball teams in Greece
Basketball teams established in 1967